Alec O'Leary (M.Mus., B.Mus., Dip. Inst. Teaching) is the director and founder of the Guitar Festival of Ireland and is widely regarded as one of the foremost guitarists of his generation. He has spent many years studying guitar with John Feeley at the DIT Conservatory of Music and Drama, Dublin, and has had tuition from many distinguished players, such as Manuel Barreuco, Roland Dyens, Scott Tennant, Sergio Assad, Elena Papandreou and Fabio Zannon. O'Leary plays regularly both as a soloist and in ensemble and has performed many times on both national radio and television. He plays guitars made for him by renowned Irish luthier Michael J. O'Leary.

Debut album
Alec released his debut album Milonga in the Summer of 2008, on GFI Masters Records. It is a solo album inspired by the music of Latin American composers and features the music of Roland Dyens, Antonio Lauro, Ástor Piazzolla, Jorge Morel, Jorge Cardoso and Antonio Carlos Jobim.

Discography
2008: Milonga - inspiration from Latin America

References

External links
 http://www.alecoleary.com
 https://web.archive.org/web/20080830080957/http://www.guitarireland.net/
 http://www.gfi.ie
 https://web.archive.org/web/20090307135535/http://www.clearnotemusic.com/

Irish classical guitarists
Living people
Year of birth missing (living people)